The Old Guard was an Australian anti-communist organisation which was founded in 1930 and was primarily active in New South Wales. Its exact origins are disputed. At least one historian has claimed that it existed as early as 1917.  It has been described as a paramilitary, quasi-official, vigilante, anti-communist organisation.

The group was primarily concerned with the social conditions arising from the Great Depression, and the actions of the Labor state government in New South Wales led by Premier Jack Lang. In response to rumours that fires would be started by agitators, the Old Guard was a driving force behind the more effective organisation of country bush fire brigades in New South Wales. As fears of a communist takeover subsided, the Old Guard lacked purpose and was dissolved sometime in the 1950s.

Secrecy
The group was sworn to absolute secrecy regarding membership, and was divided into cells so that its leadership would be hard to identify. Media reports on the group in the 1930s were scarce, and information about it has been obscured by the destruction of its own records.

Split

The New Guard split from the group in 1931. Eric Campbell wanted a more visible organisation than the secretive Old Guard. The New Guard was less of a military force than the Old Guard, which opposed the split because it was fearful of communists exploiting the division. Both groups had devised plans to neutralise each other should it be needed.

Members
At the height of its popularity, the Old Guard in Australia had a membership of around 30,000. Members were loyalists and idealists devoted to the British Empire and ready to act pre-emptively to prevent a socialist revolution in Australia.  Old Guard leaders were wealthy Protestant Anglo-Australians.  Membership in rural New South Wales, and ties to the New South Wales police force, were strong.

At the federal level the Old Guard had its closest ties to the Attorney-General's Department and the Department of Defence.
  
Like many former officers of the Australian Army George Wootten joined the Old Guard.

See also

Far-right politics in Australia
Military history of Australia

References

Further reading
 
 

1930 establishments in Australia
Organizations established in 1930
Anti-communist organizations
Far-right politics in Australia
Paramilitary organisations based in Australia
1952 disestablishments in Australia